Heusch is a surname. Notable people with the surname include:

Jacob de Heusch, Dutch painter, nephew of Willem
Luc de Heusch (1927–2012), Belgian filmmaker, writer, and anthropologist
Paolo Heusch, Italian director and screenwriter
Willem de Heusch, Dutch landscape painter and engraver